Strictly Come Dancing returned for its third series on 15 October 2005 and ended on 17 December 2005. Bruce Forsyth and Tess Daly returned to co-present the main show on BBC One, while Claudia Winkleman returned to present spin-off show Strictly Come Dancing: It Takes Two. Len Goodman, Bruno Tonioli, Craig Revel Horwood and Arlene Phillips returned as judges. The winners were Darren Gough along with his dancing partner Lilia Kopylova.

Couples
In the third series there were 12 celebrity dancers, 6 men and 6 women. In order of elimination they were:

Scoring chart

Average chart

This table only counts for dances scored on a traditional 40-point scale.

Highest and lowest scoring performances of the series
The highest and lowest performances in each dance according to the judges' scale are as follows (scores given by guest judges are deducted from the total).

Couples' highest and lowest scoring dances

Weekly scores and songs
Unless indicated otherwise, individual judges scores in the charts below (given in parentheses) are listed in this order from left to right: Craig Revel Horwood, Arlene Phillips, Len Goodman, Bruno Tonioli.

Week 1
Musical guest: Simply Red—"Perfect Love"

Running order

Week 2
Musical guest: Westlife—"You Raise Me Up"

Running order

Week 3
Musical guest: Michael Bublé—"Save the Last Dance for Me"

Running order

Week 4

Musical guest: Katie Melua—"Just Like Heaven"

Running order

Week 5
Musical guest: Beverley Knight & Jools Holland—"Where in the World"

Running order

Week 6
Musical guest: Will Young—"Happiness"

Running order

Week 7

Musical guest: Pussycat Dolls—"Sway"

Running order

Week 8: Quarter-final
Musical guest: Cliff Richard—"Do You Wanna Dance"

Running order

Week 9: Semi-final
Musical guest: Sugababes—"Ugly"

Running order

Week 10: Final

Musical guest: Bruce Forsyth—"Let's Face the Music and Dance"

Running order

Dance chart
 Highest scoring dance
 Lowest scoring dance

Week 1: Waltz or Cha-Cha-Cha
Week 2: Quickstep or Rumba
Week 3: Tango or Jive
Week 4: Foxtrot or Paso Doble
Week 5: Viennese Waltz or Samba
Week 6: One unlearned dance
Week 7: One unlearned dance
Week 8: One unlearned Latin dance and American Smooth
Week 9: Two unlearned dances (one Ballroom, one Latin)
Week 10 (Final): Favourite Ballroom, favourite Latin, and Showdance

Notes

Season 03
2005 British television seasons